Revista Lúpin (Lúpin Magazine) was a monthly Argentine comics magazine (historieta). Guillermo Guerrero and Héctor Mario Sidoli launched it on February 1, 1966. It was discontinued in 2007.

The comic takes its name from the popular Argentine comic strip hero Lúpin el Piloto, which debuted in 1959.

Concept

It featured the air adventures of its pilot hero Lúpin, as well as other strips with regular characters, usually with a technical or scientific bent. It also included plans for building model aircraft, simple electronic devices, telescopes, and other technical objects. Although never a huge popular success, it received letters from Argentine engineers, pilots, and even a NASA astronaut who read it as children.

The name Lúpin is a lunfardo word for "looping the loop" that comes from the English word "looping". The accent on the u is not standard in Spanish spelling.

Néstor Kirchner, the president of Argentina from 2003 to 2007, was nicknamed Lúpin because of his physical resemblance to the character.

Sidoli died in December 2006. It was announced in May 2007, that issue 499 of the Revista Lúpin had been the last because of a dispute between Sidoli's widow and Guerrero over author's rights. Some characters might have continued in a new magazine owned by Guerrero alone. However, Guerrero died on June 25, 2009.

References

External links
 Revista Lúpin

1966 establishments in Argentina
2007 disestablishments in Argentina
1959 comics debuts
1966 comics debuts
2007 comics endings
Comics magazines published in Argentina
Aviation comics
Fictional aviators
Fictional Argentine people
Magazine mascots
Mascots introduced in 1966
Defunct magazines published in Argentina
Magazines established in 1966
Magazines disestablished in 2007
Satirical magazines
Spanish-language magazines